Vladimiro Tarnawski (born 19 August 1939), also known as Vladimiro Tarnawsky and Walter Tarnawsky, and nicknamed Ruso (Spanish for Russian), is a retired Ukrainian Argentine football goalkeeper born in the Soviet Union.

Career
Born in the Ukrainian SSR, Tarnawski began his professional playing career in Argentina with Club El Porvenir in 1951. He played for Newell's Old Boys from 1957 to 1960, Club Atlético San Lorenzo de Almagro from 1960 to 1962 and Estudiantes de La Plata in 1963. He also made one appearance for the Argentina national football team, Chile's first victory against Argentina, on 18 November 1959.

Tarnawski finished his playing career in the United States, making 17 appearances for NASL side Boston Beacons during the 1968 season. He also played for Gotschee USC.

References

External links
 Vladimiro Tarnawsky at BDFA.com.ar 
 Ukrainian Football Diaspora @ Sport.ua

1939 births
Living people
Footballers from Kyiv
Naturalized citizens of Argentina
Argentine footballers
Argentina international footballers
Newell's Old Boys footballers
San Lorenzo de Almagro footballers
Estudiantes de La Plata footballers
Argentine Primera División players
Boston Beacons players
Philadelphia Ukrainian Nationals players
Expatriate soccer players in the United States
Soviet emigrants to Argentina
Ukrainian emigrants to Argentina
North American Soccer League (1968–1984) players
Association football goalkeepers